Nucleolar RNA helicase 2 is an enzyme that in humans is encoded by the DDX21 gene.

Function 

DEAD box proteins, characterized by the conserved motif Asp-Glu-Ala-Asp (DEAD), are putative RNA helicases. They are implicated in a number of cellular processes involving alteration of RNA secondary structure such as translation initiation, nuclear and mitochondrial splicing, and ribosome and spliceosome assembly. Based on their distribution patterns, some members of this family are believed to be involved in embryogenesis, spermatogenesis, and cellular growth and division. This gene encodes a DEAD box protein, which is an antigen recognized by autoimmune antibodies from a patient with watermelon stomach disease. This protein unwinds double-stranded RNA, folds single-stranded RNA, and may play important roles in ribosomal RNA biogenesis, RNA editing, RNA transport, and general transcription.

Interactions 

DDX21 has been shown to interact with C-jun.

References

Further reading